Kord Amir (Turkish: Kürd Emir, also Romanized as Kord Amīr, Kard Amīr, and Kurd Amīr) is a village in Juqin Rural District, in the Central District of Shahriar County, Tehran Province, Iran. At the 2006 census, its population was 2,038, in 511 families.

References 

Populated places in Shahriar County